This is a list of emerging technologies, in-development technical innovations with significant potential in their applications. The criteria for this list is that the technology must:

 Exist in some way; purely hypothetical technologies cannot be considered emerging and should be covered in the list of hypothetical technologies instead. However, technologies being actively researched and prototyped are acceptable.
 Have a Wikipedia article or adjacent citation covering them.
 Not be widely used yet. Mainstream or extensively commercialized technologies can no longer be considered emerging.

Agriculture

Construction

Electronics, IT, and communications

Entertainment

Optoelectronics

Energy

Materials and textiles

Medicine

Neuroscience

Military

Space
{|class="wikitable sortable"
|-
! Emerging technology
! Status
! Potential applications
! Related articles
|-
| Artificial gravity
| Research and development 
|  Space travel
|Spin gravity
|-
| Asteroid mining
|  Conceptual; NASA has announced plans to capture and redirect an asteroid
|Commerce, resource supply
|
|-
|Starshot
| Research
|Uncrewed interstellar probes
|
|-
|Stasis chamber
|Research and development, experiments
|Interplanetary space travel, interstellar space travel, medical
|
|-
| Inflatable space habitat
|  Development, prototypes built and tested
|  Space habitats
| Bigelow Aerospace
|-
| Reusable launch vehicle
| Commercial 
| Circumvention of the cost of expendable launch vehicles outside of national government or military missions
| Reusable launch vehicle
|}



Transport

See also

General:
Anthropogenics
Differential technological development
Diffusion of innovations
Disruptive innovation
Ecological modernization
Environmental technology
Frugal innovation
Green development
Industrial ecology
List of existing technologies predicted in science fiction
List of hypothetical technologies
List of inventions
List of inventors
Sustainable development
Technology readiness level

Ethics:
Bioethics
Casuistry
Computer ethics
Engineering ethics
Nanoethics
Neuroethics

References

Further reading
 Ten Breakthrough Technologies in 2015, MIT Technology Review
 Ten Breakthrough Technologies in 2016, MIT Technology Review
 Ten Breakthrough Technologies in 2017, MIT Technology Review
 Ten Breakthrough Technologies in 2018, MIT Technology Review
 Ten Breakthrough Technologies in 2019, MIT Technology Review
 Ten Breakthrough Technologies in 2020, MIT Technology Review

Technology development
Technology in society
Technology-related lists